Timandromorpha is a genus of moths in the family Geometridae.

Species
Timandromorpha discolor (Warren, 1896)
Timandromorpha energes (Prout, 1933)
Timandromorpha enervata Inoue, 1944

References
Natural History Museum Lepidoptera genus database

Geometrinae